Ehrenfels Castle may refer to:

Ehrenfels Castle (Bavaria), Beratzhausen, District of Regensburg, Germany 
Ehrenfels Castle (Grisons), in  Sils im Domleschg, Switzerland
Ehrenfels Castle (Kammern im Liesingtal), in Styria near Kammern im Liesingtal, Austria
Ehrenfels Castle (Hesse), a ruined castle on the Rhine River in Germany, near Rüdesheim am Rhein
Ehrenfels Castle (St. Radegund), in Styria, Austria